The 1997 European Wrestling Championships were held in the Greco-Romane style in Kouvola 22 – 25 May 1997;   the men's and  the women's  Freestyle style in Warsaw  1 – 6 May 1997.

Medal table

Medal summary

Men's freestyle

Men's Greco-Roman

Women's freestyle

References

External links
Fila's official championship website

Europe
W
W
European Wrestling Championships
Euro
Euro
Sports competitions in Warsaw
1997 in European sport